Kiangsu-Chekiang College, International Section or KCCIS is a private bilingual school in Hong Kong that teaches both English and Mandarin. Students pursue their career through the IGCSE syllabus in Years 10-11 and the IB Diploma Programme in Years 12-13. Students come from diverse backgrounds, representing over 40 nationalities.

History 

Kiangsu & Chekiang Primary School was founded in 1953 by Kiangsu and Chekiang Residents (HK) Association. Proposed by P.Y. Chow, the Supervisor, its International Section (KCIS) first opened in September 1993. The school was one of the first in Hong Kong to offer an English-medium curriculum coupled with a daily lesson in Mandarin for all children from the age of 3 to 11 years old. This allowed the school to serve more students in the Hong Kong area. Due to the high demand for schools, a new extension was established in September 2002.

This extension was known as the Upper School Campus. It used part of the Kiangsu-Chekiang College campus on Braemar Hill, North Point, for the upper Primary classes and International Secondary section.  

The number of students in the school can ranges from 300 to 400, depending on the number of classes in each grade from year 7 to 13. In year 7 to 9, students take the Key Stage 3 program; in years 10 to 11, they take the IGCSE program; and in years 12 to 13, they take the IB Diploma/IB Certificate. Key Stage 3 is not a program but a division within the UK National Curriculum, now viewed as an out-of-date system.

References 

Secondary schools in Hong Kong
International Baccalaureate schools in Hong Kong
International schools in Hong Kong
Braemar Hill
Schools in Hong Kong